Senator Pratt may refer to:

Members of the United States Senate
Daniel D. Pratt (1813–1877), U.S. Senator from Indiana from 1869 to 1875
Thomas Pratt (Maryland politician) (1804–1869), U.S. Senator from Maryland from 1850 to 1857

U.S. state senate members
Abner Pratt (1801–1863), Michigan State Senate
Eric Pratt (born 1964), Minnesota State Senate
Frank Pratt (politician) (born 1942), Arizona State Senate
George W. Pratt (1830–1862), New York State Senate
George White Pratt (1840–1899), Wisconsin State Senate
James T. Pratt (1802–1887), Connecticut State Senate
Samuel Pratt (1817–1878), Wisconsin State Senate